Watson's test, also known as the scaphoid shift test, is a diagnostic test for instability between the scaphoid and lunate bones of the wrist.

Test procedure
To perform the test, the examiner grasps the wrist with their thumb over the scaphoid tubercle (volar aspect of the palm) in order to prevent the scaphoid from moving into its more vertically oriented position in ulnar deviation. For the test, the wrist needs to be in slight extension. The patient's wrist is then moved from ulnar to radial deviation. The examiner will feel a significant 'clunk' and the patient will experience pain if the test is positive. For completeness, the test must be performed on both wrists for comparison. If the scapholunate ligament is disrupted, the scaphoid will subluxate over the dorsal lip of the distal radius.

Original Description by Watson:

Uses
Watson's test is used by physicians to diagnose scapholunate instability.
This test has a low specificity and sometimes is positive for capito-lunate instability.  As many as 20% of normal wrists will also have a 'clunk'.

See also
Carpus (commonly known as the wrist bones)
Orthopedic surgery
Wrist osteoarthritis

References
 H. Kirk Watson, et al.; 1988; Examination of the scaphoid; Journal of Hand Surgery, volume: 13A, 657–60. https://doi.org/10.1016/s0363-5023(88)80118-7

External links
'Watson test': An entry from Wheeless's Textbook of Orthopaedics.

This article uses text from the Watson's test article on WikiDoc.

Musculoskeletal examination
Wrist